Pokrovske is an urban-type settlement in Dnipropetrovsk Oblast (province) of east-central Ukraine. It hosts the administration of Pokrovske settlement hromada, one of the hromadas of Ukraine. Population: .

Pokrovske was first mentioned in historical documents in 1779. The settlement of Pokrovske got status of urban-type settlement in 1957.

Until the raion was abolished on 18 July 2020, Pokrovske was the administrative center of Pokrovske Raion. After that date the urban-type settlement became part of Synelnykove Raion.

References

External links

 The murder of the Jews of Pokrovske during World War II, at Yad Vashem website.

Urban-type settlements in Synelnykove Raion
Holocaust locations in Ukraine